Senator Helm may refer to:

John L. Helm (1802–1867), Kentucky State Senate
Joseph Helm (1848–1915), Colorado State Senate

See also
Jesse Helms (1921–2008), U.S. Senator from North Carolina